Raffael Caetano de Araújo (born 28 March 1985), known as simply Raffael, is a Brazilian professional footballer who plays as a forward or attacking midfielder. He last played for Pohronie of the Fortuna Liga.

Career

Early career in Switzerland

Born in Fortaleza, Ceará, Raffael moved still in his teens to Switzerland, first representing lowly FC Chiasso. At age 20, he moved to FC Zürich, being instrumental in the club's 2005–06 and 2006–07 league conquests; during both seasons, he led the competition in assists, while also adding 40 goals during his two-and-a-half-year spell.

Hertha BSC
In mid-January 2008, Raffael signed with German outfit Hertha BSC, being reunited with former Zürich teammates Lucien Favre and Steve von Bergen (respectively manager and player). His first game in the Bundesliga was on 2 February, in a 0–3 home defeat against Eintracht Frankfurt; the following matchday, at VfB Stuttgart, he netted his first goal, as Hertha won it 3–1.

Making 140 appearances over four and a half years, Raffael experienced both the high and low points of the Berlin-based club's recent history, including a fourth-place finish 2008–09 season, in which Hertha lead the table for some time, and relegations in 2009–10 and 2011–12. On 27 July 2012, Raffael left the club to sign for Dynamo Kyiv.

Borussia Mönchengladbach
On 20 June 2013, he left Dynamo Kyiv to sign for Borussia Mönchengladbach. On 25 June 2020, the sports director of Borussia Mönchengladbach Max Eberl confirmed that the contract of Raffael would not be renewed.

FK Pohronie
On 19 October 2021, after over a year without club affiliation, Raffael signed with Pohronie of the Fortuna Liga, with the club last in the league rankings at the time of his arrival. Following his arrival in the Žiar nad Hronom-based club, Raffael had highlighted his desire to continue enjoying football and entertaining the fans, as well as aiding the struggling club. In return, Favre highlighted Raffael as a great asset to the team and the entire league. Raffael was however released after just three games during the winter break.

Personal life
Raffael's younger brother, Ronny, is also a professional footballer. A midfielder, he represented most notably Hertha BSC, for whom he has played more than 100 games. From 2010 to 2012, the brothers played together for Hertha.

As of 2015, Raffael was studying to be a member of Jehova's Witnesses.

Career statistics

Club

Honours
FC Zürich
 Swiss Super League: 2005–06, 2006–07

Hertha BSC
 2. Bundesliga: 2010–11

References

External links

 

1985 births
Living people
Sportspeople from Fortaleza
Brazilian footballers
Brazilian expatriate footballers
Association football midfielders
FC Chiasso players
FC Zürich players
Hertha BSC players
FC Dynamo Kyiv players
FC Schalke 04 players
Borussia Mönchengladbach players
FK Pohronie players
Swiss Challenge League players
Swiss Super League players
Bundesliga players
2. Bundesliga players
Ukrainian Premier League players
Slovak Super Liga players
Expatriate footballers in Switzerland
Expatriate footballers in Germany
Expatriate footballers in Ukraine
Expatriate footballers in Slovakia
Brazilian expatriate sportspeople in Switzerland
Brazilian expatriate sportspeople in Germany
Brazilian expatriate sportspeople in Ukraine
Brazilian expatriate sportspeople in Slovakia